Following is a list of Guggenheim Fellowships awarded in 1968.
USA and Canada Fellows

 Robert John Ackermann, Professor Emeritus of Philosophy, University of Massachusetts Amherst.
 Robert Agger, Professor of Political Science, Eastern Kentucky University.
 Alvin Ailey, deceased. Dance.
 Stephen Albert, deceased. Music Composition: 1968, 1978.
 Richard Dale Alexander, Theodore H. Hubbell Distinguished University Professor of Evolutionary Biology and Curator of Insects, University of Michigan.
 Richard Lee Armstrong, deceased. Earth Science.
 Edward M. Arnett, R. J. Reynolds Professor Emeritus of Chemistry, Duke University.
 Julius Ashkin, deceased. Particle Physics.
 Klaus Baer, deceased. Near Eastern Studies.
 Raghu Raj Bahadur, deceased. Statistics.
 Bruce Baillie, filmmaker, Camano Island, Washington.
 Gordon Edward Baker, Professor Emeritus of Political Science, University of California, Santa Barbara.
 Endre Alexander Balazs, CEO, Biomatrix, Inc, Ridgefield, New Jersey.
 Ransom Leland Baldwin, Jr., Professor of Animal Science and of Physiology, University of California, Davis.
 Clinton Edward Ballou, Professor of Biochemistry and Molecular Biology, University of California, Berkeley.
 Walter Darby Bannard, artist; independent artist.
 Gunther Barth, Emeritus Professor of History, University of California, Berkeley.
 Hyman Bass, Roger Lyndon Collegiate Professor of Mathematics, University of Michigan.
 Peter A. Beak, Roger Adams Professor of Chemistry, University of Illinois at Urbana-Champaign.
 Manson Benedict, Institute Professor Emeritus and Professor Emeritus of Nuclear Engineering, Massachusetts Institute of Technology.
 Robert Oliver Berdahl, Professor of Educational Studies, State University of New York at Buffalo.
 Rainer Berger, Professor of Geography and Geophysics, University of California, Los Angeles.
 Luciano Berio, composer; conductor, Radicondoli (Siena), Italy.
 Aron M. Bernstein, Professor of Physics, Massachusetts Institute of Technology:.
 Ira Borah Bernstein, Professor of Mechanical Engineering and Physics, Yale University.
 Abraham Bers, Professor of Electrical Communications, Massachusetts Institute of Technology.
 Allan George Bogue, Frederick Jackson Turner Professor of History, University of Wisconsin–Madison.
 Frank Paul Bowman, Professor of French, University of Pennsylvania: 1968, 1986.
 Richard Pender Boyce, Professor of Biochemistry, University of Florida College of Medicine.
 Philip Williams Brandt, Professor of Anatomy, College of Physicians and Surgeons, Columbia University.
 Gerard Joseph Brault, Edwin Erle Sparks Professor Emeritus of French & Medieval Studies, Pennsylvania State University.
 Philip James Bray, Hazard Professor of Physics, Brown University.
 John McColl Bremner, Curtiss Distinguished Professor Emeritus in Agriculture, Professor of Agronomy and Biochemistry, Professor of Biochemistry, and Charles F. Curtiss Distinguished Professor in Agriculture, Iowa State University.
 Richard Bridgman, Professor Emeritus of English, University of California, Berkeley.
 Gandy Brodie, deceased. Fine Arts.
 Sanborn C. Brown, deceased. History of Science.
 Paolo Buggiani, artist, Rome, Italy.
 Jack Bush, deceased. Fine Arts.
 Marvin Albert Carlson, Sidney E. Cohn Distinguished Professor, Graduate Center, City University of New York
 R. V. Cassill, writer; Professor Emeritus of English, Brown University.
 Sunney Ignatius Chan, Professor of Chemical Physics and Biophysical Chemistry, California Institute of Technology.
 Benjamin Chu, Distinguished Professor of Chemistry, SUNY at Stony Brook.
 Alvin John Clark, Professor Emeritus of Genetics, University of California, Berkeley.
 David Delano Clark, deceased. Physics.
 Robert Cogan, composer; Chairman of Graduate Theoretical Studies, Professor of Composition, New England Conservatory of Music.
 Albert Cohen, William H. Bonsall Professor of Music, Stanford University.
 Richard F. Conrat, photographer; Instructor in Photography, San Francisco Art Institute.
 Jacob Ernest Cooke, John Henry MacCracken Professor Emeritus of History, Lafayette College.
 John Corigliano, composer, Professor of Music, Lehman College, Juilliard, and Manhattan School of Music.
 Patrick Cruttwell, deceased. English.
 Jackie Wayne Culvahouse, Professor of Physics, University of Kansas.
 Virginius Dabney, deceased. U.S. History.
 David Joseph Danelski, Director of University Program, Stanford in Washington.
 Gerard Debreu, Professor of Economics and Mathematics, University of California, Berkeley.
 Lawrence Sanford Dembo, Professor Emeritus of English, University of Wisconsin–Madison.
 Robert De Niro, Sr., deceased. Fine Arts, Painting.
 Albert Dorfman, deceased. Biochemistry.
 Réjean Ducharme, novelist, Montreal, Canada.
 Eric Berry Edney, Professor Emeritus of Biology, University of California, Los Angeles.
 Herman Theodore Epstein, Emeritus Professor of Biophysics, Brandeis University.
 Amitai Etzioni, University Professor, George Washington University.
 Gil Evans, deceased. Music Composition: 1968.
 Richard Felciano, composer; Professor of Music, University of California, Berkeley.
 Horst Frenz, deceased. American Literature.
 Jacques Robert Fresco, Pfeiffer Professor in the Life Sciences, Princeton University.
 Harold Clark Fritts, Professor Emeritus of Dendrochronology, University of Arizona.
 Robert Eric Frykenberg, Emeritus Professor of History and South Asian Studies, University of Wisconsin–Madison: 1968.
 Norman Gall, writer, São Paulo, Brazil; Executive Director, Fernand Braudel Institute of World Economics, São Paulo.
 Neal Ward Gilbert, Professor of Philosophy, University of California, Davis.
 Leon Gillen, writer.
 Robert George Gilpin, Jr., Eisenhower Professor of Politics and International Affairs, Princeton University.
 James P. Giuffre, composer, West Stockbridge, Massachusetts.
 Edward Glassman, Professor Emeritus of Biochemistry and Genetics, University of North Carolina School of Medicine at Chapel Hill.
 Morris Golden, deceased. English.
 Leon Golub, artist, New York City.
 Thomas F. Green, Margaret O. Slocum Professor Emeritus of Education, Syracuse University.
 Oscar Wallace Greenberg, Professor of Physics, University of Maryland, College Park. # Thomas McLernon Greene, Frederick Clifford Ford Professor of English and Comparative Literature, Yale University.
 Robert Halsband, deceased. 18th Century English Literature: 1968, 1982.
 Stuart Newton Hampshire, William H. Bonsall Professor in The Humanities, Stanford University.
 George Maxim Anossov Hanfmann, deceased. Classics.
 Donald R. F. Harleman, Ford Professor Emeritus of Engineering, Massachusetts Institute of Technology.
 Richard Colebrook Harris, Professor of Geography, University of British Columbia.
 John Eugene Hearst, Emeritus Professor of Chemistry, University of California, Berkeley.
 Alan J. Heeger, Professor of Physics, University of California, Santa Barbara.
 Cecil John Herington, deceased. Classics.
 Javier Herrero, William R. Kenan, Jr. Professor of Spanish, University of Virginia.
 Dudley Robert Herschbach, Frank B. Baird, Jr. Professor of Science, Harvard University.
 Robert Lee Hess, deceased. African Studies. President of Brooklyn College.
 Roger Henry Hildebrand, Samuel K. Allison Distinguished Service Professor, University of Chicago.
 Jocelyn Nigel Hillgarth, Senior Fellow and Professor of History, Pontifical Institute of Mediaeval Studies; Professor, Centre for Medieval Studies, St. Michael's College, University of Toronto.
 Hugh Wiley Hitchcock, Distinguished Professor Emeritus of Music and Director, Institute for Studies in American Music, Brooklyn College, City University of New York.
 Julian Hochberg, Centennial Professor of Psychology, Columbia University.
 David S. Hogness, Professor of Biochemistry, Stanford University School of Medicine.
 Donald Frank Holcomb, Emeritus Professor of Physics, Cornell University.
 Samuel Hollander, Professor of Economics, University of Toronto.
 John Joseph Hopfield, Professor of Molecular Biology, Princeton University: 1968.
 Robert Hughes, deceased. Film.
 Jerard Hurwitz, Professor, Sloan-Kettering Institute for Cancer, Memorial Sloan-Kettering Cancer Center, New York Cit.
 Dell Hathaway Hymes, Commonwealth Professor Emeritus of Anthropology (English), University of Virginia.
 Esther Merle Jackson, Professor of Theatre and Drama, University of Wisconsin–Madison.
 Thorkild Jacobsen, deceased. Near Eastern Studies.
 Frederick Richard Jensen, deceased. Chemistry.
 William John Jones, Emeritus Professor of History, University of Alberta.
 Dale W. Jorgenson, Professor of Economics, Harvard University.
 Donald Judd, deceased. Fine Arts.
 Alexander G. Karczmar, Professor Emeritus of Pharmacology and Therapeutics, Stritch School of Medicine, Loyola University of Chicago.
 Walter J. Karplus, Professor of Engineering and Applied Science, University of California, Los Angeles.
 Ronald L. Katz, Professor of Anesthesiology, University of Southern California.
 Herbert Katzman, artist; Instructor in Fine Arts, School of Visual Arts, New York City.
 Robert L. Kellogg, Emeritus Professor of English, University of Virginia.
 Mark Jonathan Kesselman, Professor of Government, Columbia University.
 Thomas Kinsella, poet; Professor Emeritus of English, Temple University: 1968, 1971.
 William Klement, Jr., retired Associate Professor of Engineering and Applied Science, University of California, Los Angeles.
 Alison Knowles, artist, New York City.
 Verdel Kolve, UCLA Foundation Professor of English Literature, University of California, Los Angeles.
 Takeshi Kotake, Emeritus Professor of Mathematics, Tohoku University.
 Max Kozloff, art critic, New York City.
 Saul Aaron Kripke, James McCosh Professor of Philosophy, Princeton University: 1968, 1977.
 Louis Kronenberger, deceased. Literary Criticism.
 Ursula S. Lamb, deceased. Professor Emeritus of History, University of Arizona.
 Jacob Landau, artist, Professor Emeritus of Art, Pratt Institute.
 Arthur LaVelle, Professor Emeritus of Anatomy, University of Illinois at the Medical Center, Chicago
 Irving Lavin, Professor of Art History and Permanent Member, School of Historical Studies, Institute for Advanced Study, Princeton, New Jersey.
 David Lazarus, Professor of Physics, University of Illinois at Urbana-Champaign.
 Maurice Antoine Lecuyer, Professor of French, Rice University.
 Benjamin W. Lee, deceased. Nuclear Physics.
 Eric H. Lenneberg, Deceased. Psychology.
 Lawrence Levine, Professor of Biochemistry, Brandeis University.
 John Leon Lievsay, deceased. 16th and 17th Century English Literature.
 Herbert Samuel Lindenberger, Avalon Foundation Professor of Humanities, Stanford University.
 Lucy R. Lippard, art critic, Galisteo, New Mexico.
 Benjamin Y. H. Liu, Professor of Mechanical Engineering, University of Minnesota.
 Kwang-Ching Liu, Emeritus Professor of History, University of California, Davis.
 Shaw Livermore, Jr., Professor of History, University of Michigan.
 Edgar Lohner, deceased. German.
 Ole Ivar Lövaas, Professor of Psychology, University of California, Los Angeles.
 Robert M. Lumiansky, Deceased. Medieval Studies.
 Ronald Duncan Macfarlane, Professor of Chemistry, Texas A&M University.
 Wilhelm Magnus, deceased. Mathematics.
 Samuel Maitin, artist, Philadelphia.
 Saul Maloff, writer, Southbury, Connecticut.
 Charles Bartlett McGuire, Professor of Public Policy, University of California, y.
 James Allen McMurtry, Professor Emeritus of Entomology, University of California, Riverside; Courtesy Professor, Oregon State University.
 George J. McNeil, deceased. Fine Arts: Painting.
 Arthur B. Metzner, H. Fletcher Brown Professor Emeritus of Chemical Engineering, University of Delaware.
 Harry Alvin Miskimin, Jr., deceased. Economic History.
 Joseph John Moldenhauer, Mody C. Boatright Regents Professor in American and English Literature, University of Texas at Austin.
 Raymond Joseph Monsen, Jr., Professor Emeritus of Business, Government, and Society, University of Washington.
 Jeanne R. Monty, Professor of French, Tulane University.
 David C. Moore, Associate, Center for European Studies, Harvard University.
 Julius M. Moravcsik, Professor of Philosophy, Stanford University.
 Stephen Ivor Morse, deceased. Medicine.
 Yiannis N. Moschovakis, Professor of Mathematics, University of California, Los Angeles.
 Simon Charles Moss, M. D. Anderson Professor of Physics, University of Houston.
 Frederick Wade Mote, Professor Emeritus of East Asian Studies, Princeton University: 1968, 1987.
 Warner Muensterberger, psychiatrist, New York City.
 Robert F. Murphy, deceased. Professor of Anthropology, Columbia University.
 John Joseph Murray, deceased. British History.
 Mark Nelkin, Research Professor of Physics, New York University.
 Howard Nemerov, deceased. Poetry.
 Allan Nevins, deceased. U.S. History.
 Lafayette Noda, Professor Emeritus of Biochemistry, Dartmouth Medical School.
 Thomas W. Ogletree, Professor of Theological Ethics, Yale Divinity School.
 Douglas Dean Ohlson, artist; Professor of Art, Hunter College, City University of New York.
 Harry Meyer Orlinsky, deceased. Religion.
 James T. Patterson, Professor of History, Brown University.
 Edward Paulson, Professor of Mathematics, Queens College, City University of New York.
 Norman Perrin, deceased. Religion.
 Robert Louis Pfaltzgraff, Jr., Shelby Cullom Davis Professor of International Security Studies, Fletcher School of Law and Diplomacy, Tufts University, Medford Massachusetts.
 Fredrick B. Pike, Professor Emeritus of History, University of Notre Dame.
 David Plowden, photographer, Winnetka, IL.
 Elijah Polak, Professor of Electrical Engineering and Computer Sciences, University of California, Berkeley: 1968.
 Norman Pollack, Professor Emeritus of History, Michigan State University.
 Derek John de Solla Price, deceased. History of Science.
 Jaan Puhvel, Professor of Classics and Indo-European Studies, University of California, Los Angeles.
 Calvin F. Quate, Leland T. Edwards Professor of Engineering, Stanford University.
 David John Randall, Professor of Zoology, University of British Columbia.
 Orest Allen Ranum, Professor of History, Johns Hopkins University.
 Roy A. Rappaport, deceased. Anthropology.
 Jane Cassels Record, deceased. Sociology.
 Carl P. Resek, Professor of History, State University of New York at Purchase.
 Stanford P. Rosenbaum, Professor Emeritus of English Literature, University College, University of Toronto.
 John David Rosenberg, William Peterfield Trent Professor of English and Comparative Literature, Columbia University.
 Lionel Rothkrug, Professor Emeritus of History, Concordia University.
 Jeffrey Burton Russell, Professor of History, University of California, Santa Barbara.
 Ludwig Sander, deceased. Fine Arts: 1968.
 Andrew Sarris, film critic; Professor of Film, Columbia University.
 Peter Eli Schlein, Professor of Physics, University of California, Los Angeles.
 Roger A. Schmitz, Keating-Crawford Professor of Chemical Engineering, University of Notre Dame.
 Ivan Albert Schulman, Emeritus Professor of Spanish, University of Illinois at Urbana-Champaign.
 Erich Segal, writer, New York City.
 Paul H. Shepard, deceased. General Non-Fiction.
 Sam Shepard, playwright, Mill Valley, California: 1968, 1971.
 Nathan Silver, architect; London, England.
 Eckehard Peter Herbert Simon, Victor S. Thomas Professor of Germanic Languages and Literatures, Harvard University.
 Isadore M. Singer, Institute Professor, Massachusetts Institute of Technology: 1968, 1975.
 Denis Sinor, Distinguished Professor Emeritus of Uralic and Altaic Studies, Indiana University: 1968, 1981.
 L. E. Sissman, deceased. Poetry.
 Philip S. Skell, Professor of Chemistry, Pennsylvania State University.
 Anthony Peter (Tony) Smith, deceased. Fine Arts-Sculpture.
 Mark Richard Smith, writer; Emeritus Professor of English, University of New Hampshire.
 Ralph Ingram Smith, Deceased. Biology.
 Gary Snyder, Professor of English, University of California at Davis.
 Charles Philip Sonett, Regents' Professor Emeritus of Planetary Sciences, University of Arizona.
 Anthony Sorce, artist, New York City.
 George Sperling, UCI Distinguished Professor of Psychology, University of California, Irvine.
 Albert Stadler, artist, New York City.
 Lawrence W. Stark, Professor of Physiological Optics and Engineering Science, University of California, Berkeley.
 Mortimer P. Starr, Professor of Bacteriology, University of California, Davis
 Roger Breed Stein, Emeritus Professor of Art History, University of Virginia at Charlottesville.
 Harry Stone, Professor of English, California State University, Northridge.
 Robert A. Stone, Rosenkranz Writer in Residence, Yale University.
 Andrew Streitwieser, Jr., Professor of Chemistry, University of California, Berkeley.
 Joseph Sucher, Professor Emeritus of Physics and Astronomy, University of Maryland, College Park.
 Robert Suderburg, composer-in-residence and Professor of Composition, Williams College: 1968, 1974.
 Harry Suhl, Professor of Physics, University of California, San Diego.
 Sidney George Tarrow, Maxwell M. Upton Professor of Government, Cornell University.
 Kurt Philip Tauber, The Class of 1924 Professor of Political Science, Williams College.
 Edward W. Tayler, Lionel Trilling Professor in the Humanities and Professor of English, Columbia University.
 Bernard Teyssèdre, Professor of Esthetics, University of Paris I; Director, Institute of the Esthetics and Sciences of Art, Paris.
 Trygve R. Tholfsen, Professor Emeritus of History, Teachers College, Columbia University.
 Thomas Darrah Thomas, Emeritus Distinguished Professor of Chemistry, Oregon State University.
 John M. Thompson, Associate Director, American Universities Field Staff, Hanover, New Hampshire.
 Lionel Tiger, Charles Darwin Professor of Anthropology, Livingston College, Rutgers University.
 Robert C. Tucker, Professor Emeritus of Politics, Princeton University.
 James W. Valentine, Professor Emeritus of Integrative Biology, University of California, Berkeley: 1968.
 Cornelius Clarkson Vermeule III, Curator of Classical Art, Museum of Fine Arts, Boston; Curator of Coins, Massachusetts Historical Society, Boston: 1968.
 Arthur Taylor von Mehren, Joseph Story Professor Emeritus of Law, Harvard University.
 Speros Vryonis, Jr., Director, Speros Basil Vryonis Center for the Study of Hellenism, Rancho Cordova, California.
 Salih Jawad Wakil, Chairman, Distinguished Service Professor and L. T. Bolin Professor of Biochemistry, Baylor College of Medicine, Houston.
 Clarence Marvin Wayman, Professor of Metallurgical Engineering, University of Illinois at Urbana-Champaign.
 David Weinrib, Visiting Professor, Artist, Garnerville, New York.
 Stanley Weintraub, Evan Pugh Professor of Arts & Humanities, Pennsylvania State University.
 Siegfried Wenzel, Emeritus Professor of English, University of Pennsylvania: 1968, 1982.
 Richard Manning White, Professor of Electrical Engineering and Computer Sciences, University of California, Berkeley.
 Neil Williams, deceased. Fine Arts.
 Alan B. Wilson, Professor of Education, University of California, Berkeley.
 Eugene Wong, Associate Director, Physical Science and Engineering, The White House, Washington, D.C..
 Marshal Henry Wrubel, deceased. Astronomy-Astrophysics.
 Alfred Chi-Tai Wu, Professor of Physics, University of Michigan.
 Charles Wuorinen, composer, New York City: 1968, 1972.
 John Milton Yinger, Professor Emeritus of Sociology and Anthropology, Oberlin College.
 Oran R. Young, Professor of Environmental Studies and Director, Institute of Arctic Studies, Dartmouth College, Hanover, NH.
 Norman Zammitt, artist, Pasadena, California.
 Martin H. Zimmermann, deceased. Biology-Plant Science.
 Norman Earl Zinberg, deceased. Psychology.
 Bruno Zumino, Professor of Physics, University of California, Berkeley: 1968, 1987.

Latin American and Caribbean Fellows
 Jorge Washington Abalos, Professor of Zoology and Director, Center of Applied Zoology, National University of Córdoba.
 Ana María V. Barrenechea, retired Professor of Spanish American Literature, Columbia University.
 Genaro R. Carrió, deceased. Law.
 Darcy Closs, Former Director of Human Resources, Federal Data Processing Service, Brasília.
 Edgardo Cozarinsky, writer and Filmmaker, Paris.
 José Donoso, deceased. Fiction: 1968, 1973.
 Luis Guillermo Durán Solano, Professor of Geology, National University of Colombia.
 Salvador Elizondo, writer; Professor of Compared Literature, National Autonomous University of Mexico: 1968, 1973.
 Mario Eusebio Foglio, Professor of Physics, Gleb Wataghin Institute of Physics, State University of Campinas.
 Peter R. Heintz, deceased. Sociology.
 Braulio Iriarte, General Academic, Secretary, National Institute of Astrophysics, Optics and Electronics, Tonantzintla, Puebla, Mexico.
 Oscar Magnan, Sculptor; Professor, Department of Fine Arts, St. Peter's College.
 Manuel Maldonado-Denis, deceased. Political Science: 1968.
 Luis Eduardo Mora-Osejo, Professor of Botany, National University of Colombia; Director, Botanical Garden of Bogotá.
 José Mordoh, former head, Cancerology Department, CIMAE, Buenos Aires: 1968, 1970.
 Braulio Orejas-Miranda, deceased. Biology.
 Federico Manuel Peralta Ramos, deceased. Argentinian artist.
 Alejandra Pizarnik, Argentinian poet.
 José Antonio Priani Piña, architect, Mexico.
 Eduardo Antonio Rabossi, Senior Research Fellow, National Research Council of Argentina, Buenos Aires: 1968, 1991.
 Juan Rulfo, deceased. Fiction.
 León Schidlowsky, composer; Associate Professor of Music, Tel-Aviv University.
 Demetrio Sodi Morales, deceased. Anthropology.
 Antonio Tauriello, composer; conductor, Colon Theatre, Buenos Aires.
 Marta Traba, Deceased. Fine Arts Research.
 Jesús Urzagasti Aguilera, writer; cultural editor, Presencia, La Paz.
 Osvaldo René Vidal, Member, Board of Directors, National Scientific and Technological Research Council (CONICET), Buenos Aires.

External links
Guggenheim Fellows for 1968

See also
Guggenheim Fellowship

1968
1968 awards